Claremont Isles is a national park located in Queensland, Australia, 1783 km northwest of Brisbane. Established in 1989, the isles are managed by the Queensland Parks and Wildlife Service.

The isles constitute an important breeding and roosting habitat for a variety of birds, specially seabirds. The habitat consists of coral reefs and swaths of offshore seagrass. This makes it a unique habitat for the birds. To preserve the area, going ashore is prohibited.

The elevation of the terrain is 11.7 meters.

Wildlife

The isles provided habitat to a variety of birds and animals.

Birds
There are three islands in the Claremont Isles National Park: Fife, Pelican and Burkitt islands. All three islands have breeding populations of terns. Burkitt Island is an important breeding ground for the pied imperial pigeon. Migratory species such as the beach stone-curlew also flock to the island's extensive sand flats and lagoons. Australian terns lend the Pelican Island their name and Fife Island is famous for its population of wedge-tailed shearwaters.

See also

 Protected areas of Queensland

References

National parks of Far North Queensland
Protected areas established in 1989